Silvestre Ochagavía Echaurren (born 28 July 1862–29 January 1934) was a Chilean politician and lawyer who served as President of the Senate of Chile.

External links
 BCN Profile

1820 births
1892 deaths
Chilean people
Chilean politicians
University of Chile alumni
Presidents of the Senate of Chile